Numident, or "Numerical Identification System," is the Social Security Administration's computer database file of an abstract of the information contained in an application for a United States Social Security number (Form SS-5). It contains the name of the applicant, place and date of birth, and other information. The Numident file contains all Social Security numbers since they first were issued in 1936.

See also
Death Master File

References

Social security in the United States
Government databases in the United States